Venancio Flores Barrios (18 May 1808 – 19 February 1868) was a Uruguayan political leader and general. Flores was President of Uruguay from 1854 to 1855 (interim) and from 1865 to 1868.

Background and early career
In 1839, he was made political chief of the department of San José. He fought in the "Guerra Grande" against Manuel Oribe and his Argentine backers. He became a leading figure in the Colorado Party and formed a triumvirate with Fructuoso Rivera and Juan Antonio Lavalleja in 1853.

First Presidency of Uruguay (interim)
He served as interim President of Uruguay and remained in power until August 1855, when overthrown by the Blanco president Manuel P. Bustamante, which resulted in civil war and Flores taking refuge in Argentina.

Civil war role
In 1863, he started a rebellion (Cruzada Libertadora or liberating crusade) against the Blanco president Bernardo Berro, which led to civil war in Uruguay. With Argentine and Brazilian help, by February, 1865 he had taken Montevideo, overthrowing his predecessor.

Second Presidency of Uruguay

During his rule, Flores joined Brazil and Argentina in the devastating Paraguayan War.

Flores's government ended on February 15, 1868.

Assassination

Four days after stepping down as President, Flores was murdered by a group of unidentified assassins. But although Flores' killers were not formally identified, it may be added that as a background to his assassination is the intermittent Uruguayan Civil War which continued throughout much of the 19th century between Colorados and Blancos.

Legacy

The Flores Department was named in his honor by a later Colorado President of Uruguay, Máximo Santos.

References

See also

 Máximo Santos#Creation of Flores Department

 History of Uruguay

Presidents of Uruguay
People from Flores Department
Uruguayan cattlemen
Defence ministers of Uruguay
Uruguayan people of Spanish descent
Assassinated Uruguayan politicians
1808 births
1868 deaths
People murdered in Uruguay
Uruguayan National Army generals
Burials at Montevideo Metropolitan Cathedral
19th-century Uruguayan people
1868 murders in South America
Uruguayan military personnel of the Paraguayan War
19th-century murders in Uruguay